The Flieger MG 29 (also called the Flab MG or FLab MG 29/38) was a Swiss light machine gun developed in the 1920s and produced until shortly before the dawn of the Second World War. It was mounted on aircraft and was later used as an anti-aircraft gun. However, it was too heavy to be used as am infantry support weapon. It employed a closed bolt system. Some guns had the ability to bolt a large box onto the bottom of the machine gun to hold the ammunition belt. Two versions of the gun existed, the "normal" version and a second version which bolted two guns together and made them to fire from the same trigger, known as the "Doppel-MG" (double machine gun). After the second world war, better anti aircraft systems and aircraft weapons were available to Switzerland and the infantry support role was filled by the MG 51. The higher rate of fire, but much heavier MG 29 was finally mounted on the first prototype of the Panzer 58, the precursor to the more famous Panzer 61 tank before being retired.

External links
 http://theswissriflesdotcommessageboard.yuku.com/topic/13013/FlabMG-2938#.VTQ7hiFVhBc

Machine guns of Switzerland
Light machine guns